Bray Park railway station is located on the North Coast line in Queensland, Australia. Despite the name, Bray Park railway station is located in the north of the suburb of Strathpine in the Moreton Bay Region (immediately to the south of the suburb of Bray Park). Strathpine railway station is in the south of Strathpine.

History
In September 1985, the Queensland Government provided funding to build Bray Park station in the state budget. In 2001, a third platform opened as part of the addition of a third track from Bald Hills to Lawnton.

Services
Bray Park is served by all City network services from Kippa-Ring to Central, many continuing to Springfield Central

Services by platform

Transport links
Thompsons Bus Service operate four routes via Bray Park station:
671: Westfield Strathpine to Warner
672: Westfield Strathpine to Warners Lake
673: Westfield Strathpine to Joyner
674: Westfield Strathpine to Warner Village

References

External links

Bray Park station Queensland Rail
Bray Park station Queensland's Railways on the Internet

Railway stations in Moreton Bay Region
Shire of Pine Rivers
North Coast railway line, Queensland